The unofficial 1940 International Cross Country Championships was held in Paris, France, at the Bois de Boulogne on March 24, 1940.  The event was open for male junior athletes.

Complete results, medallists, 
 and the results of British athletes were published.

Medallists

Individual Race Results

Junior Men's (5 mi / 8.0 km)

Team Results

Men's

Participation
An unofficial count yields the participation of 27 athletes from 3 countries.

 (9)
 (9)
 (9)

See also
 1940 in athletics (track and field)

References

International Cross Country Championships
International Cross Country Championships
Cross
International Cross Country Championships
International Cross Country Championships
Cross country running in France